Cam Thủy may refer to several places in Vietnam, including:

Cam Thủy, Quảng Bình, a rural commune of Lệ Thủy District.
, a rural commune of Cam Lộ District.